The following is a list of episodes of the BBC television detective drama series, Dalziel and Pascoe. 46 episodes of the series were broadcast over the course of eleven series.

Series overview

Episodes

Series 1 (1996)

Series 2 (1997)

Series 3 (1998)

Series 4 (1999)
Beginning with this series, the show's title music has been removed.

Series 5 (2000)
Series goes to widescreen (16:9) starting with Series 5.

Series 6 (2001)

Series 7 (2002)

Series 8 (2004)
The eighth series was broadcast in the United Kingdom as four standard 90-minute episodes, as per series one through seven. However, in Europe, the series was broadcast in a similar format to series nine through eleven, splitting the stories into two 45-minute episodes broadcast on consecutive nights. The air dates used here are the original British dates.

Series 9 (2005)
The DVD release of this series contains the internationally broadcast versions of each episode, which remove twenty minutes of footage from each two-hour story, presumably to include adverts where required in international broadcast. In the UK each episode was first broadcast as two one hour parts on consecutive days.

Series 10 (2006)
The DVD release of this series contains the internationally broadcast versions of each episode, which remove twenty minutes of footage from each two-hour story, presumably to include adverts where required in international broadcast.

Series 11 (2006-2007)
Series eleven was filmed as a block of five episodes between January and May 2006, but the broadcast in the United Kingdom saw episodes one and two billed as series eleven and episodes three to five billed as series twelve. However, all other international broadcasts saw the episodes billed as one series. The DVD release of this series contains the internationally broadcast versions of each episode, where the two parts have been joined to create a feature-length episode. However, these still remove twenty minutes of footage from each two-hour story, presumably to include adverts where required in international broadcast.

References and notes

Lists of British crime television series episodes
Lists of British drama television series episodes